The 2004 African Cup of Nations, known as the NOKIA African Cup of Nations, Tunisia 2004 for sponsorship reasons (also referred to as AFCON 2004 or CAN 2004) is the 24th edition of the Africa Cup of Nations, the biennial international men's football championship of Africa organized by the Confederation of African Football (CAF). The tournament was hosted by Tunisia. The qualifying phase takes place from 7 September 2002 to 6 July 2003. Cameroon as title holder and Tunisia as host country automatically qualify for the final phase of the tournament.

The competition takes place in six stadiums between 24 January and February 14, 2004. As in the 2002 edition, sixteen teams, divided into four groups each comprising four teams, take part in the competition. Tournament defending champions Cameroon eliminated in the quarter-finals after failing to win their match against Nigeria.

Tunisia won their first title after defeating one-time champions Morocco 2–1 in the final, and Nigeria finished third after beating Mali 2–1 in the third place play-off. As champions, Tunisia qualified for the 2005 FIFA Confederations Cup in Germany, as a representative of CAF.

Host selection 
Bids :
 Benin / Togo
 Malawi / Zambia
 Tunisia
 Zimbabwe

The organization of the 2004 Africa Cup of Nations was awarded to Tunisia on 4 September 2000 by the CAF Executive Committee meeting in Cairo, Egypt. Voters had a choice between four countries : Malawi and Zambia (joint bid), Tunisia and Zimbabwe.

Benin and Togo were both also candidates at the start (joint bid) but withdrew on 4 September 2000 before the meeting.

This edition was awarded to Tunisia which represented Africa in the 1998 FIFA World Cup in France by taking the majority of the votes of the CAF Executive Committee members which are 13 after its impressive success in the 1994 edition.

This is the third time that Tunisia has hosted the African Cup after 1965 and 1994 Africa Cup of Nations.

Sponsorship 
On 20 September 2003, in Tunis, Nokia acquired from CAF the right to be the "title sponsor" of the 24th edition, which is therefore officially called NOKIA Africa Cup of Nations, Tunisia 2004.

Mascot 
To choose the tournament mascot, the organizing committee is launching a competition open to the entire Tunisian population. The only rules imposed, this mascot must be an eagle and must represent football, Africa and Tunisia.

Of the fifty or so proposals submitted to the committee, it is the work of Malek Khalfallah that is retained. It is an eagle, which the author baptized Nçayir. The colors of its equipment, red and white, refer to the colors of the Tunisian flag.

Match ball 
The official ball for the 2004 African Cup of Nations is the Adidas Fevernova. Designed two years earlier by Adidas for the 2002 FIFA World Cup, the ball was reused during 2004 African Cup of Nations.

Qualification 

The 49 nations registered for the competition are divided into thirteen groups: ten groups of four teams and three groups of three teams. The selections of Guinea-Bissau, Sao Tome and Principe and Djibouti forfeit before the start of qualifying.

The first of each group qualify for the final tournament in Tunisia, as well as the best of the second. Cameroon, as defending champion, and Tunisia, as host country, are automatically qualified for the final phase of the competition.

First participation 
Benin and Rwanda manage to qualify for the AFCON for the first final phase of their history, after finishing at the top of their group in the qualifiers in front of two former African champions, Sudan and Ghana.

Zimbabwe do the same after finishing first in the finalists in all qualifying groups.

Qualified teams 
The following sixteen teams qualified for the tournament.

Venues 
The five cities selected to host the event are coastal.

Match officials
The following referees were chosen for the 2004 Africa Cup of Nations.

Referees

  Divine Evehe
  Abubakar Sharaf
  Jérôme Damon
  Modou Sowe
  Tessama Hailemalek
  Falla N'Doye
  Mohamed Guezzaz
  Abdul Hakim Shelmani
  Essam Abd El Fatah
  Lassina Paré
  Coffi Codjia
  Alain Hamer
  Eddy Maillet
  Koman Coulibaly
  Ali Bujsaim
  Hichem Guirat

Squads 
As is the case in all versions of the African Cup of Nations, each team participating in the tournament must consist of 23 players (including three goalkeepers). Participating national teams must confirm the final list of 23 players no later than ten days before the start of the tournament. In the event that a player suffers an injury which prevents him from participating in the tournament, his team has the right to replace him with another player at any time up to 24 hours before the team's first game.

Format
Only the hosts received an automatic qualification spot; the other 15 teams qualified through a qualification tournament. At the finals, the 16 teams were drawn into four groups of four teams each. The teams in each group played a single round robin. After the group stage, the top two teams from each group advanced to the quarter-finals. The quarter-final winners advanced to the semi-finals. The semi-final losers played in a third place match, while the semi-final winners played in the final.

Draw 
The draw took place on 20 September 2003 in Tunis. In parentheses, the FIFA World Rankings as of 14 January 2004.

Match summary 
The 16 national teams participating in the tournament together played a total of 32 matches ranging from group stage and progression matches to knockout matches, with teams eliminated through the various progressive stages. Rest days are set aside during the different stages to allow players to recover during the tournament.

Group stage 
Teams highlighted in green progress to the quarter-finals.

All times local: CET (UTC+1)

Tiebreakers 
Teams were ranked according to points (3 points for a win, 1 point for a draw, 0 points for a loss), and if tied on points, the following tiebreaking criteria were applied, in the order given, to determine the rankings (Regulations Article 74):

 Points in head-to-head matches among tied teams;
 Goal difference in head-to-head matches among tied teams;
 Goals scored in head-to-head matches among tied teams;
 If more than two teams were tied, and after applying all head-to-head criteria above, a subset of teams were still tied, all head-to-head criteria above were reapplied exclusively to this subset of teams;
 Goal difference in all group matches;
 Goals scored in all group matches;
 Drawing of lots.

Group A

Group B

Group C

Group D

Knockout stage

Quarter-finals

Semi-finals

Third place match

Final

Statistics

Goalscorers 
There were 88 goals scored in 32 matches, for an average of 2.75 goals per match.
4 goals

  Patrick M'Boma
  Frédéric Kanouté
  Jay-Jay Okocha
  Francileudo Santos

3 goals

  Aboubacar Titi Camara
  Youssouf Hadji
  Osaze Odemwingie
  Peter Ndlovu

2 goals

  Hocine Achiou
  Modeste M'Bami
  Mahamadou Diarra
  Marouane Chamakh
  John Utaka
  Mamadou Niang
  Siyabonga Nomvete
  Ziad Jaziri
  Pascal Feindouno

1 goal

  Abdelmalek Cherrad
  Mamar Mamouni
  Brahim Zafour
  Moussa Latoundji
  Dieudonné Minoungou
  Samuel Eto'o
  Alain Masudi
  Tamer Abdel Hamid
  Mohamed Barakat
  Ahmed Belal
  John Wamalwa Baraza
  Emmanuel Ake
  Titus Mulama
  Dennis Oliech
  Sedonoude Abouta
  Soumaïla Coulibaly
  Mohamed Sissoko
  Dramane Traoré
  Nabil Baha
  Talal El Karkouri
  Abdeslam Ouaddou
  Youssef Safri
  Jawad Zairi
  Garba Lawal
  Joseph Yobo
  João Elias
  Karim Kamanzi
  Saïd Abed Makasi
  Habib Beye
  Papa Bouba Diop
  Patrick Mayo
  Khaled Badra
  Selim Ben Achour
  Najeh Braham
  Jawhar Mnari
  Joel Lupahla
  Adam Ndlovu
  Esrom Nyandoro

Own goal
  Anicet Adjamossi (Against Morocco)

Tournament team rankings
As per statistical convention in football, matches decided in extra time are counted as wins and losses, while matches decided by penalty shoot-outs are counted as draws.

Awards 
The following awards were given at the conclusion of the tournament:

CAF AFCON Team of the Tournament

Media

Broadcasting

References

External links 

 Details at RSSSF

 
International association football competitions hosted by Tunisia
African Cup of Nations
Nations
Africa Cup of Nations tournaments
African Cup of Nations
African Cup of Nations